= Pauline's: Memoirs of The Madam on Clay Street =

1960 novel by Harper Lee

Pauline's
- Author: Pauline Tabor
- Language: English
- Genre: Autobiography
- Published: September 26, 1971
- Publisher: Touchstone Publishing Company
- Publication place: United States
- Pages: 259

Pauline's: Memoirs of The Madam on Clay Street was written by Pauline Tabor and published in 1971.

== Biographical background and publication ==
Tabor wrote about her own experience of running a successful brothel in her hometown in Bowling Green, Kentucky, recounting her many struggles within the conservative community and legal troubles.
